The Absolute Sound (TAS) is an American audiophile magazine which reviews high-end audio equipment, along with recordings and comments on various music-related subjects.

History
The Absolute Sound was founded in 1973 by Harry Pearson, who was its editor-in-chief and publisher. In the early years, TAS was a quarterly, digest-sized magazine and accepted no advertisements. During the 1970s and 1980s, TAS (along with Stereophile) was influential in the audiophile industry. Pearson is credited as being the most important figure in the rise of High-End audio.

Until the mid- to late 1990s, Pearson owned and directed all rights to TAS. The magazine was published by Pearson Publishing Inc., which also published a sister high-end video review magazine published quarterly called The Perfect Vision. Pearson remained the chairman of its editorial advisory board until 2006 and regularly contributed a feature entitled HP's Workshop until his departure in 2012. The magazine is now published by Absolute Multimedia, Inc., of Austin, Texas.

References

External links

Professional and trade magazines
1973 establishments in Texas
Magazines established in 1973
Magazines published in Austin, Texas
Music magazines published in the United States
Ten times annually magazines